Muktabai Dixit (Devanagari: मुक्ताबाई दीक्षित) (1901 or 1902 - 1977) was a Marathi writer from Maharashtra, India.

Biography
She was born in December 1901 in the town of Edalabad in Khandesh. After finishing her high school education in Huzurpaga girls' school in Pune in 1922, she received her college education at S. P. College, also in Pune, to obtain her B.A. degree in philosophy and psychology from Mumbai University. After receiving a degree in teaching, she served as a teacher for seven years at Maharani High School in Baroda. In 1935, she obtained a master's degree in Marathi literature from Nagpur University and joined the faculty of Thackersey College of SNDT Women's University in Pune as a professor of Marathi. Her husband owned the shop 'International Book Service', which is located in the Deccan Gymkhana area of Pune.

Literary work

Collections of short stories
 Manas Lahari (मानस-लहरी)
 Aniruddha Prawaha (अनिरुद्ध प्रवाह)

Plays
 Jugar (जुगार) (1950) (This play has been translated into Hindi and Kannada.)
 Awaliya (अवलिया) (1956)

Critiques
 Dixit wrote critiques of the poetry of Madhav Julian and Anant Kanekar, the collection of Kanekar's short stories Jagatya Chhaya (जागत्या छाया), and the play Gharabaher (घराबाहेर) of Prahlad Keshav Atre.

References

1901 births
1977 deaths
Marathi-language writers
Indian short story writers
Indian dramatists and playwrights
Indian women short story writers
Indian women dramatists and playwrights